Euxton, also known as Euxton Junction, was a railway station on the Bolton and Preston Railway in Euxton, Chorley, Lancashire, England. It was opened on 22 June 1843 and closed on 2 April 1917. The line remains open between Preston and Bolton, however nothing remains of the station.

References

 https://maps.nls.uk/geo/explore/side-by-side/#zoom=14&lat=53.67646&lon=-2.66953&layers=156&right=ESRITopo
 https://www.leylandhistoricalsociety.co.uk/bb-03.html
 http://www.prestonstation.org.uk/docs/Notable%20Stations%20and%20Their%20Traffic%20-%20Preston%20-%20rm05-1926-337.pdf
 https://www.wiganworld.co.uk/album/photo.php?opt=3&id=14781&gallery=..

Disused railway stations in Chorley
Former Lancashire and Yorkshire Railway stations
Railway stations in Great Britain opened in 1843
Railway stations in Great Britain closed in 1917